The Fish River, New Zealand, is a river in the Otago Region of New Zealand. A tributary of the Makarora River, it rises east of Mount Burke and flows south-eastward through Mount Aspiring National Park, crossing  at 44° 6.97'S  169° 20.66'E, to join that river south of Haast Pass.

The river was named by Julius von Haast in 1863 Charles Cameron travelled up the Fish River a few weeks earlier.

See also
List of rivers of New Zealand

References

Land Information New Zealand - Search for Place Names

Rivers of Otago
Mount Aspiring National Park
Rivers of New Zealand